Joseph Naso (born January 7, 1934) is an American serial killer and serial rapist sentenced to death for the murders of four women. He was also implicated in the murders of other women.

Biography 

Joseph Naso was born on January 7, 1934 in Rochester, New York. After serving in the U.S. Air Force in the 1950s, he met his first wife, Judith. Their marriage lasted for 18 years, but after the divorce, Naso continued visiting his ex-wife, who lived in the San Francisco Bay Area. The couple had a son named Charles who later developed schizophrenia, and Naso spent his later years caring for him.

Naso took classes in various San Francisco colleges in the 1970s and lived in the Mission District of San Francisco and then in Piedmont, California, in the 1980s. He lived in Sacramento between 1999 and 2003 and finally settled in Reno, Nevada in 2004, where he was arrested in 2011. He worked as a freelance photographer and had a long history of petty crimes such as shoplifting, which he committed even in his mid-seventies. His acquaintances nicknamed him "Crazy Joe" for his behavior.

Victims 
 Roxene Roggasch was found dead on January 10, 1977, her body dumped near Fairfax, California. She was 18 years old and stood 5'2". She had been strangled. Police estimated she was killed less than a day before. Police suspected that Roggasch had worked as a sex worker, but her family denied this. 
 Carmen Lorraine Colon, 22, was found on August 13, 1978, along Carquinez Scenic Highway, a road between Crockett and Port Costa, just thirty miles from the first victim's body. A Highway Patrol officer investigating reports of a cattle shooting found a decomposing nude body that had been dumped. The body was later identified as Colon's.
 The body of Sharileea Patton, 56, washed ashore near the Naval Net Depot in Tiburon, California in 1981. At the time of her death, she was a resident of the Bay Area looking for a job. Naso managed the residence where the woman used to live. He also took a photo of the victim. He was considered the prime suspect by police in 1981 but gave the investigators only elusive answers and was not charged for the next thirty years.
 Sara Dylan, a Bob Dylan groupie (born Renee Shapiro, she later changed her name to that of the singer's former wife), was last seen on her way to a Dylan concert at the Warfield theater in San Francisco in May 1992. She was killed in or near Nevada County, California.
 In 1993, the body of Pamela Ruth Parsons, a waitress, was found in Yuba County, California. She was 38. Parsons worked near Cooper Avenue in Yuba City, where Naso lived at that time.
 Tracy Lynn McKinney Tafoya was found dead in 1994, also in Yuba County. She was 31. The killer drugged, raped, and strangled her and left the body near Marysville Cemetery. It has been estimated that a week passed before the body was found.

Arrest, trial and conviction 
Nevada parole and probation authorities arrested Naso in April 2010. While searching his home, authorities discovered a handwritten diary in which Naso listed ten unnamed women with geographical locations. On April 11, 2011, he was charged with the murders of Roggasch, Colon, Parsons and Tafoya. The police listed all four victims as prostitutes. The other six women mentioned in the diary remained unidentified. 

Later, prosecutors Dori Ahana and Rosemary Sloat introduced evidence identifying Patton and Dylan. On August 20, 2013, Naso was convicted by a Marin County jury of the murders. On November 22, 2013, a Marin County judge sentenced him to death for the murders.

Naso was also a person of interest in the Rochester Alphabet murders of 1971–73 case since four of his victims bore double initials, just as the Rochester murder victims and Naso had lived there for a long time. Naso, however, was ruled out of that case when DNA found on Californian victims was not matched to the DNA found on a Rochester victim's body.

See also 
 List of serial killers in the United States
 List of serial killers by number of victims

References 

1934 births
20th-century American criminals
American male criminals
American people convicted of murder
American people convicted of theft
American prisoners sentenced to death
American rapists
American serial killers
Businesspeople from Reno, Nevada
Businesspeople from Rochester, New York
Businesspeople from Sacramento, California
Businesspeople from San Francisco
Crime in California
Criminals from California
Criminals from New York (state)
Criminals of the San Francisco Bay Area
History of Marin County, California
Living people
Male serial killers
People convicted of murder by California
People from Yuba City, California
Prisoners sentenced to death by California
United States Air Force airmen
Violence against women in the United States